Fernando António de Carvalho Festas (born 12 June 1956 in Vila do Conde) is a Portuguese retired football central defender and manager.

External links

1956 births
Living people
People from Vila do Conde
Portuguese footballers
Association football defenders
Primeira Liga players
Varzim S.C. players
Vitória S.C. players
Sporting CP footballers
S.C. Braga players
S.C. Salgueiros players
Portugal under-21 international footballers
Portugal international footballers
Portuguese football managers
Primeira Liga managers
Liga Portugal 2 managers
S.C. Freamunde managers
F.C. Penafiel managers
Gil Vicente F.C. managers
Sportspeople from Porto District